Fantastic Television Limited (or HOY) is a commercial free-to-air television broadcasting company in Hong Kong owned by i-Cable Communications, which also owns Hong Kong Cable Television (Cable TV). Fantastic Television draws resources and programming libraries from Cable TV.

Established in 2009, the company's broadcast licence was granted by the Hong Kong Government on 31 May 2016. The company operates three channels: Cantonese HOY TV since 14 May 2017, English Hong Kong International Business Channel (HKIBC) since 30 July 2018, and Cantonese HOY Information Channel since 21 November 2022.

As of 2018, Fantastic Television's channels are broadcast through Cable TV's network, and not available on terrestrial television.

On 1 April 2022, Fantastic Television's channels are broadcast free-to-air.

Channels
 HOY TV (channel 77): Formerly named Fantastic TV Chinese Channel and Hong Kong Open TV.
 Hong Kong International Business Channel (channel 76): The channel was tentatively named Fantastic TV English Channel, but after Forever Top's acquisition of Fantastic Television's parent company I-Cable Communications in 2017, it was later announced in early June 2018 that the channel would be launched as an English and Putonghua business channel named HKIBC. The channel simulcasts Bloomberg Television for most of the day, but also relays CGTN in the mornings from 7 am to 9 am. The channel produces English language news bulletins which are aired in the evenings, and also airs non-business and obligatory programmes as mandated in the licence.
 HOY Infotainment (channel 78) launched on 21 November 2022.

References

External links
 
 HKIBC

The Wharf (Holdings)
Television in Hong Kong
Television stations in Hong Kong
Mass media companies of Hong Kong
2009 establishments in Hong Kong
Mass media companies established in 2009
Television channels and stations established in 2017